The Toronto Patriots are a junior "A" ice hockey team from Toronto, Ontario, Canada.  They are a part of Ontario Junior Hockey League.

History

Quinte (1996–1998)
In 1996, the Quinte Hawks of Deseronto, Ontario were granted expansion into the Metro Junior A Hockey League.  David Frost was brought in to coach the team.  Frost faced criminal charges in 2008 for his conduct for his time with the team, but was acquitted.  Frost brought with him Mike Jefferson and Sheldon Keefe.  Although both would play in the National Hockey League, Jefferson (later changed to Danton) would become famous for a mysterious murder-for-hire plot that targeted Frost and landed him in prison.

Bancroft (1998–2007)
In 1998, the Metro Junior A Hockey League folded and merged with the Ontario Provincial Junior A Hockey League.  The Hawks moved into the OPJHL but were relocated to Bancroft, Ontario.  In nine seasons, the Bancroft Hawks would never celebrate a winning season.

In 2007, due to mounting troubles with finding appropriate ownership and supporting the team financially, the Bancroft Hawks were granted a leave from the Ontario Hockey Association.

Upper Canada (2008–present)
In the summer of 2008, a group of Toronto-based businessmen bought the rights to the Bancroft franchise, renamed the team the Upper Canada Hockey Club and moved the team to the North York district of Toronto.  The club had a working relationship with Upper Canada College but was not directly affiliated.  Despite owning the franchise that used to be the Hawks, no member of the UCHC was involved with the manifestations of the franchise in either Deseronto or Bancroft.

The Upper Canada Hockey Club's first game was an 8-5 loss to the Seguin Bruins on September 6, 2008.  The team's first win was at home against the Villanova Knights, 5-4 on September 14, 2008.  In 2009, the team changed their name to the Patriots and moved to the Etobicoke district of Toronto. Two seasons later they became the Toronto Lakeshore Patriots. In 2011, the Patriots had their best season yet when they finished third in the South Division and made it to the Conference Final, eventually losing to the Whitby Fury.

In 2014, the team dropped "Lakeshore" from its name. That season, the team won the Buckland Cup and Dudley Hewitt Cup. In 2015, the Patriots won the Buckland Cup for the second consecutive year. They advanced to the Dudley Hewitt Cup tournament but were eventually eliminated by the Fort Frances Lakers.

Season-by-season results

Dudley Hewitt Cup
Central Canada ChampionshipsWinners of the NOJHL, OJHL, SIJHL, and hostRound-robin play with 2nd vs. 3rd in semi-final to advance against 1st in the championship game.

Royal Bank Cup
Canadian Junior A National ChampionshipDudley Hewitt Champions – Central, Fred Page Champions – Eastern, Western Canada Cup Champions – Western, Western Canada Cup – Runners-up and hostRound-robin play with top four advance to a semi-final and the winners to the championship game.

Playoffs
MetJHL Years
1997 Lost Semi-final
Quinte Hawks defeated Wellington Dukes 4-games-to-1
Third in round-robin quarter-final (4–2)
Aurora Tigers defeated Quinte Hawks 4-games-to-2
1998 Lost Quarter-final
Wexford Raiders defeated Quinte Hawks 3-games-to-none

Notable alumni

Quinte
Ryan Barnes
Mike Danton
John Erskine
Sheldon Keefe
Rudi Ying

References

External links
Toronto Patriots website

Defunct Ontario Provincial Junior A Hockey League teams
Etobicoke
Ice hockey teams in Toronto